The University of Western Australia Hockey Club (UWAHC), is represented in every level of competition within Hockey WA which includes the top Men's and Women's Division, the Men's Wizard Cup and the Women's Wizard League competitions in Western Australia. It was formed in 1924 to cater for students at The University of Western Australia who wanted to play field hockey.

The University of WA Hockey Club (UWAHC) is one of the largest hockey clubs in Western Australia with over 400 members in men's, women's and junior teams. Along with being one of the largest clubs in WA it is one of the strongest clubs in competition, with a majority of the teams annually reaching finals. The recent decade has seen the UWAHC accomplish outstanding levels of success.

The club is located at the University Sports Park, McGillivray Oval, McGillivray Road off Brockway Road, Mt Claremont, behind HBF Stadium (Perth Superdrome). The fields are a 10 minutes drive from the UWA.

Roll of Honour

Men's

Club
First Grade Champions (10):
1945, 1947, 1949, 1992, 1993, 1995, 2002, 2004, 2005, 2007

The Fairest & Best Award is awarded to the player who receives the most votes from the Hockey WA Olympians Medal (Men's First Division).
The HK Smith Players Player Award is awarded to the player who receives the most votes from his teammates (First Division).
The Peter Sims Award is awarded to the Best player Under the age of 21 (First Division).
The Danny Dunn Award is awarded For the best first year player.

InterVarsity
The University of Western Australia competes in InterVarsity Hockey against other Western Australian Universities at the Western University Games Series (run by Tertiary Sports WA, or TSWA) and against other Australian Universities at the Australian University Games for the Syme Cup.

The University of Western Australia has won the Syme Cup a total of 16 times. The club sent their first Men's team to the 1934 InterVarsity Hockey which was held in Adelaide, SA and won by The University of Melbourne (MUHC), and won their first Syme Cup in 1946 when the carnival was held in Perth, WA.

The Men's Team Mascot is Tonka the Truck.

In Recent times the team have been dominant, recording their 7th straight win of the Syme Cup in 2010.

To be eligible to represent The University of Western Australia at InterVarsity competition, players must be enrolled at The University of Western Australia, but do not necessarily need to play Club hockey for UWAHC.

The Ross Field Award is awarded to the Best UWAHC player who competes for UWA at InterVarsity (Australian University Games). It was first awarded in 1975.

Women's

Club
First Grade Champions (14):
1949, 1977, 1979, 1980, 1983, 1988, 1990, 1994, 2002, 2005, 2008, 2010, 2011, 2014.

The Fairest & Best Award is awarded the player who receives the most votes from her teammates (First Division).
The Susan Wood Award is awarded to the Best player Under the age of 21 (First Division).
The Angela Kelly Award is awarded For the best first year player.

InterVarsity

The University of Western Australia has won the Women's Hockey Cup a total of 11 times. The club sent their first Women's team to the 1946 InterVarsity Hockey which was held in Adelaide, SA and achieved immediate success winning at their first attempt.

The Women's Team Mascot is a Porcelain Statue.

In recent times the team has recorded strong performances, playing in their 3rd consecutive Gold Medal Match and recording their 2nd straight win of the Women's Hockey Cup in 2010.

The Erica Herron Award is awarded to the Best UWAHC player who competes for UWA at InterVarsity (Australian University Games). It was first awarded in 1982.

Club records
David Viner 329 First Grade Games

UWAHC Legends Teams
UWAHC selected a Men's and Women's Legends team to celebrate its 80th anniversary in 2004.

Men's

Coach: Frank Murray
Captain: Michael Nobbs
GK: Damon Diletti
FB: Geoff Boyce
FB: Steve Hayward
RH: Michael Boyce
CH: Michael Nobbs
LH: David Viner
RW: Tristram Woodhouse
RI: Frank Murray
CF: Mark Hager
LI: Rob Clement
LW: Craig McKenzie
RES GK: John Nettleton
RES FB: Frank Fitzgerald
RES HB: Denis Reynolds
RES U: Matthew Jones
RES ST: Chris Rourke

Other Legends
Syd Johnson
Ray Strauss
Alan Barblett
Robert F Brindley
Todd Williams
Matthew Wells

Women's

Coach: Pam Rothwell
Captain: Jennifer Wealand (now Edmonds)
GK: Chris Worthington
FB: Perrie Henderson
FB: Fiona Simpson (now Miotti)
RH: Sandy Johnstone
CH: Anthea Haselhurst
LH: Jennifer Wealand (now Edmonds)
RW: Sally Carbon (now Broadbridge)
RI: Suzie Ferguson (now Wood)
CF: Julie Waddell
LI: Pippa Thompson (now Button)
LW: Julie McCormack
RES GK: Liz Allen-Williams (now Pederick)
RES FB: Pam Babb
RES HB: Sarah Pugsley
RES FB: Robyn Kemp (now Harvey)
RES ST: Felicity Barrett-Lennard (now Perry)

Other Legends
Margaret Heron (now Longson)
Kathleen Partridge
Rechelle Hawkes
Nikki Mott (now Hudson)
Claire Mitchell-Taverner

References

http://www.uwahockey.org.au/awards.html

External links
 http://www.uwahockey.org.au/index.html
 http://www.hockey.sport.uwa.edu.au/

Australian field hockey clubs
Sports teams in Western Australia
Field hockey in Western Australia
1924 establishments in Australia
Field hockey clubs established in 1924
University of Western Australia
West